Central Press may refer to: 
Central News Agency (London), an English news distribution service founded as Central Press in 1863
Central Press Association, an American newspaper syndicate that operated from 1910 to 1971